David Campbell was a Negro league second baseman between 1938 and 1942.

Campbell made his Negro leagues debut in 1938 with the New York Black Yankees. He played for New York again in 1939, then spent three seasons with the Philadelphia Stars, where he finished his career in 1942.

References

External links
 and Seamheads

Place of birth missing
Place of death missing
Year of birth missing
Year of death missing
New York Black Yankees players
Philadelphia Stars players
Baseball second basemen